Blendon is an area of South East London within the London Borough of Bexley, located between Bexleyheath and Sidcup.

History

It is probably named after the Bladindon family who owned land in the area. Blendon Hall was built in 1763, was sold to a local housing developer in 1929 and eventually demolished to make way for suburban housing. Today the area is a middle-class residential district with a small row of shops along the western stretch of Blendon Road.

Transport

Rail 
The closest National Rail station to Blendon is Albany Park.

Buses
Albany Park is served by four Transport for London bus services.
 132 to North Greenwich via Eltham and to Bexleyheath (Weekend 24 Hour Service)
 B13 to New Eltham and to Bexleyheath
 B14 to Orpington via Sidcup and to Bexleyheath
 N21 to Trafalgar Square via Eltham, Lewisham and New Cross and to Bexleyheath (Night Service)

Nearby areas 
Blendon borders Bexleyheath to the north and north east, Bexley to the east, Albany Park to the south east, south and south west, Blackfen to the west and Welling to the north west.

References

Areas of London
Districts of the London Borough of Bexley